Autopass Card is a stored-value smart card for paying VEP fees, toll charges and ERP fees in Singapore. The card can only be sold to foreign motorists. As vehicle information is encoded in the card, it is not transferable between vehicles. It can also act as a NETS CashCard (chip version) or NETS FlashPay card (contactless version) for all NETS retail transactions, and paying carparks that use the Electronic Parking System.

Autopass Cards slotted in In-Vehicle units (IU) installed in the vehicle automatically are deducted when the vehicle passes through an ERP gantry. If one does not have an IU, they can take a daily pass to enter the ERP areas such as the Central Business District and Orchard Road. The pass is purchased at $10, valid for one day per pass, for foreign registered cars to enter the CBD during on-peak hours during weekdays. Since 2005, the cost of the pass has been reduced by half.

Autopass Cards are sold at the primary clearance/ immigration booths or VEP/ Tolls office at the Tuas and Woodlands checkpoints in Singapore. Motorists are required to produce valid road tax discs and insurance certificates for their cars when buying the Autopass Cards.

See also 
 Johor–Singapore Causeway

References

Payment cards
Road transport in Singapore